Robert Lee Williams (May 12, 1931 – January 19, 2021) was an American professional basketball player. He played in the National Basketball Association for the Minneapolis Lakers during the 1955–56 season and part of the 1956–57 season. Williams was the Lakers franchise's first black player.

Williams died in his Rosemont, Minnesota, home on January 19, 2021, at age 89.

References

1931 births
2021 deaths
American men's basketball players
Basketball players from Florida
Florida A&M Rattlers basketball players
Harlem Globetrotters players
Minneapolis Lakers players
Small forwards
Sportspeople from Pensacola, Florida
Undrafted National Basketball Association players